Robert Brandt (born October 21, 1982 in Helsinki) is a Finnish long track speed skater who participates in international competitions.

Personal records

Career highlights

European Allround Championships
2006 - Hamar, 30th
2008 - Kolomna,  25th
National Championships
2002 - Seinäjoki,  3rd at allround
2003 - Seinäjoki,  1st at 10000 m
2003 - Seinäjoki,  3rd at allround
2004 - Helsinki,  2nd at 5000 m
2004 - Seinäjoki,  1st at 10000 m
European Youth-23 Games
2004 - Göteborg,  3rd at 10000 m

External links
Brandt at Jakub Majerski's Speedskating Database
Brandt at SkateResults.com

1982 births
Finnish male speed skaters
Living people
Sportspeople from Helsinki